The Price Media Law Moot Court Competition or  Price Moot in short, is an annual international moot court competition. Described as a competition "for raising the profile of freedom of expression by bringing informed and effective debate and discussion on significant issues of information flows and technology to many parts of the world", the Price Moot focuses on international media law and related human rights such as freedom of expression, freedom of religion, freedom of association, and various facets of privacy. The main sources of law engaged include the Universal Declaration of Human Rights, European Convention on Human Rights, and the International Covenant of Civil and Political Rights. Recurring topics include online hate speech and the responsibility of internet intermediaries. With more than a hundred teams taking part annually, the Price Moot is the world's largest competition in its field and is considered one of the grand slam or major moots.

The moot was created and organised by the Programme in Comparative Media Law and Policy at the University of Oxford, and is named after the programme's founding director, Monroe E. Price, a professor specialising in communications law. In 2017, the Bonavero Institute of Human Rights took over as the organiser. The international rounds of the competition are held at the University of Oxford; a series of events is typically organised leading up to these rounds, such as seminars on human rights and masterclasses on advocacy. National and regional rounds were introduced in 2010 and have since taken place in Afghanistan, the Americas, Asia-Pacific, China, Africa, East Africa, West Africa, Middle East, South Asia, Northern Europe, Northeast Europe, and Southeast Europe. In 2019, regional rounds were made mandatory for all teams, with no possibility of direct qualification for Oxford. In 2022, the Southeast Europe and Northeast Europe rounds were merged into the Central Eastern Europe rounds.

As of the tenth edition of the moot (2017), 130 universities from 52 countries have taken part in the competition. Singapore Management University, which made its debut in 2010, has the best track record in the moot, having reached the finals on six occasions (2010, 2015, 2016, 2017, 2018, and 2020 (winning the 2010, 2016, 2017, and 2020 editions)), won Best Memorials thrice (2010, 2016, and 2018), won Best Finals Oralist thrice (2017, 2018, and 2020), and won Best Oralist twice (2017 and 2022). In addition, Singapore Management University was the first champion school to have won both Best Finals Oralist and Best Oralist in the same year (2017).

Under the current rules, each university may send a team comprising up to six members. National and regional round procedures may vary, but in Oxford, each team will compete in between three and four preliminary rounds. The top 16 teams then advance to the knockout rounds, and the final two teams compete in the international championship round following the octo-finals, quarter-finals, and semi-finals. In every round, each team has 45 minutes (rebuttals inclusive) to plead a case. Each team also has to prepare a set of written submissions for applicant and respondent before the oral phase of the competition begins; the scores for the written submissions count toward qualification up till a certain point, and since 2016, written submissions have been re-graded for the international rounds, superseding regional round scores. In 2020, travel restrictions brought about by the COVID-19 pandemic meant that a modified version of the moot was conducted online for the 2020 edition's international rounds; the regional rounds were completed per usual. For the 2021 and 2022 editions, with most travel restrictions still in place, all rounds remained online, but for the 2023 edition, various rounds reverted to the in-person format.

Competition records

References

International law
Moot court competitions